Miss Gold Digger (lit. "Prudent/Careful Miss Shin") is a 2007 South Korean romantic comedy film.

Plot 
Shin Mi-soo is juggling relationships with four different men, adopting a different persona for each one. But her love life becomes increasingly tangled, and the men show their true colors when they find out how they've been manipulated.

Cast 
 Han Ye-seul as Shin Mi-soo
 Lee Jong-hyuk as Dong-min
 Kwon Oh-joong as Joon-seo
 Kim In-kwon as Yoon-cheol
 Son Hoyoung as Hyeon-joon
 Jeong Gyoo-soo as Mr. Choi
 Yoo Eun-jeong as Yeong-mi
 Oh Seo-won as Hye-jeong
 Jo Hye-jin as Mi-soo's friend
 Park Hyeon-jin as Yoo-jin
 Jeong Da-yeong as Dong-hee
 Jeong Hae-soo as Yeong-mi's husband
 Lee Won-jae as Vice manager
 Yoo Soon-cheol as Monk
 Park Joon-mook as Kid at apartment
 Ban Hye-ra as Woman at apartment
 Lee Jeong-hak as Squad leader
 Kang Rae-yeon as Yang Dae-ri (cameo)
 Lee Jae-hoon as Drunken man (cameo)
 Im Ye-jin as Mi-soo's mother (cameo)
 Chun Ho-jin as Mi-soo's father (cameo)
 Yoon Joo-sang as Dong-min's father (cameo)
 Hong Yeo-jin as Dong-min's mother (cameo)

References

External links 
  
 
 
 

2007 films
2000s Korean-language films
South Korean romantic comedy films
Sidus Pictures films
2000s South Korean films